Afghanistanism is a term, first recorded in the United States, for the practice of concentrating on problems in distant parts of the world while ignoring controversial local issues. In other contexts, the term has referred to "hopelessly arcane and irrelevant scholarship",
"fascination with exotic, faraway lands", or "Railing and shaking your fist at an unseen foe who is quite unaware of your existence, much less your fury".

Origin
The Oxford English Dictionary lists Afghanistanism as a U.S. colloquialism; the first written citation it provides is from 1948: J. Lloyd Jones in Probl. Journalism (American Society of Newspaper Editors Convention) 73, "I don't wish to belabor this subject of Afghanistanism, this business of taking forthright stands on elections in Costa Rica, while the uncollected local garbage reeks beneath the editor's window."

Robert H. Stopher and James S. Jackson, writing in their April 1948 column "Behind the Front Page", said the "new term" was coined by Jenkin Lloyd Jones of Oklahoma's Tulsa Tribune at that same convention, in Washington, D.C. They quoted Jones as saying:
The tragic fact is that many an editorial writer can't hit a short-range target. He's hell on distance. He can pontificate about the situation in Afghanistan with perfect safety. It takes more guts to dig up the dirt on the sheriff.
But columnist Joe Klein wrote in Time magazine in 2010 that the term originated in the 19th century when "the British press defined Afghanistanism as the obsession with obscure foreign wars at the expense of domestic priorities", adding that "Afghanistanism seems likely to become a national debate [in the United States] before long: "Is building roads and police stations in Afghanistan more important than doing so at home?"

Applications
The concept earlier came to have several applications. On one hand it was applied in North American journalism to newspaper articles about faraway places that were irrelevant to local readers. Other writers said, though, that Afghanistanism was the tendency of some editors to avoid hard local news by writing opinion pieces about events happening in distant lands. As New York Times writer James Reston put it about journalists, "Like officials in Washington, we suffer from Afghanistanism. If it's far away, it's news, but if it's close to home, it's sociology."

Earlier, educator Robert M. Hutchins used the expression in a speech at the California Institute of Technology in 1955:

Afghanistanism, as you know, is the practice of referring always to some remote country, place, person or problem when there is something that ought to be taken care of near at home that is very acute. So you say to a professor at Caltech, "What about smog?" and he says, "Have you heard about the crisis in Afghanistan?"

In 1973, the concept was adapted to reporting on environmentalism, which was said by journalism researchers Steven E. Hungerford and James B. Lemert to deal with environmental problems of distant communities rather than local ones. This observation was echoed in 2004 by B.A. Taleb, who called it "displacing the [environmental] problems and issues to other places and ignoring their existence in one's own community or country".

Resurfacing
After the attacks on the World Trade Center in New York City on September 11, 2001, the concept resurfaced, with some writers asserting that it was no longer applicable to contemporary events. For example, Stuart H. Loory, chair in Free-Press Studies at the University of Missouri School of Journalism, wrote on December 1, 2001:

A primary mission of the news business is to work as a distant early warning signal of impending problems for the public and those who can deal with those problems. It must work in a convincing way, and that means news organizations must train and educate journalists to work in various parts of the world knowledgably. They cannot fit the image now in vogue — that of parachutists jumping into an area to cover disaster on short notice. That perpetuates "Afghanistanism," a concept that has long since outlived its usefulness, if it ever had any at all.

See also
 American exceptionalism
 Media bias
 Psychological projection
 Somebody else's problem
 Whataboutism, a more general deflection in American political discourse

References and notes

Further reading

Tom Kamara, "Woes of the African Journalist", The Perspective, March 12, 2001 "For example, few in Europe knew if a country called Guinea existed. But this has changed since a European, The Netherlands' Ruud Lubbers, is now head of the United Nations High Commission for Refugees (UNHCR) faced with mounting refugee problems in that country. Guinea is now known, particularly in Holland. His presence there is news, and if the plight of tens of thousands of refugees is mentioned in passing, good luck! (This is journalism, what used to be called 'Afghanistanism' — distant issues not to bother home readers with.)"
Kombo Mason Braide, "Pseudo-Afghanistanism & The Nigeria Intellectual", Niger Delta Congress website "Afghanistanism crept into contemporary Nigerian journalese around 1984, during the military dictatorship of Major General Mohammadu Buhari, who grossly breached the fundamental human right of freedom of expression of Nigerians with impunity. Essentially, Mohammadu Buhari made it a crime for his subjects to think. In a frenzy of conceited righteousness, he dished out a farrago of stiff sanctions against anyone who dared to express opinions (true or not) that could embarrass public officers (like him!)."
 "Where in the World Is News Bias", News Bias Explored: The Art of Reading the News, student project at the University of Michigan
 George Pyle, "Afghanistanism, the Next Generation", Buffalo News, October 14, 2009. "The old cliche among editorial writers was that if you didn't have the nerve to write something critical of the governor, the mayor or the school board -- or if they hadn't given you cause to write something critical of them -- you could always write about Afghanistan."
 Naomi Ishizaki, "Editor's Note: Afghanistanism", ColorsNW. "Since the 1970s, the term 'Afghanistanism' was used in U.S. newsrooms to describe regions of the world that were so remote and foreign, there was no reason to report about them because Americans had no interest in their people and events."
 "Fine Kettle of Fish, Film at 11", The Word Detective, November 27, 2001. " 'Afghanistanism' was a term coined in the mid-20th century to criticize the tendency of news media to concentrate on happenings in remote corners of the world to the exclusion of covering problems closer to home."
 Jeff Simon, "A Great Day for Couric and CBS News" (commentary), Buffalo News, October 9, 2009. "Afghanistanism ... was, according to a journalistic elder a few decades ago, the perfect word to describe lengthy journalism about some absurdly far-flung place ... that couldn’t possibly matter to a reader or TV watcher as much as a new carpet store in your favorite plaza or a local church deacon busted for cleaning out the rectory safe."
 Charles R. Eisendrath, "From the Head Fellow: Rushing Forward, Looking Back", The Journal of the Michigan Fellows, Winter 2001. "Remember 'Afghanistanism?' Until September 11 it meant 'safe to discuss because too remote to care about.
 Jonathan Randal, Osama: The Making of a Terrorist, Vintage, 2005, page 71 . "When I started out in journalism, 'Afghanistanism' was shorthand for recondite, faraway, and complex foreign problem of secondary interest defying easy explanation, much less solution."
 "Against Afghanistanism: a note on the morphology of Indian English", The Yearbook of South Asian Languages and Linguistics, pages 269–273, cited in J.L. May and Keith Brown, Concise Encyclopedia of Pragmatics, Second Edition, Elsevier Science, 2009, page 669 
 Judy Bolch, "The Hometown Newspaper Builds Community", in What Good Is Journalism?: How Reporters and Editors Are Saving America's Way of Life, University of Missouri Press, 2007, page 69 . "...back when that term meant not Osama Bin Laden but rather stories that seemingly had little to do with the price of rugs in Alabama."

19th-century neologisms
Criticism of journalism
Environmental terminology
History of the foreign relations of the United States
History of United States isolationism
History of the United Kingdom
Metaphors referring to places
Political terminology